Bjørn Haga (7 April 1926 – 2010) was a Norwegian journalist.

He was born in Odda. After finishing his secondary education in 1947 he studied political science between 1949 and 1953, then took one year at the Norwegian Journalist Academy. He began his journalistic career in Nordlys from 1954 to 1959 and Fremtiden from 1959 to 1963. He was a sports journalist, and also wrote about jazz. He later worked for Norwegian Broadcasting Corporation radio and became a news anchor in Dagsrevyen, the main newscast of the Norwegian Broadcasting Corporation, at that time the only television channel in Norway.

The Lund Commission found that Haga was subjected to secret surveillance by the Norwegian Police Security Service in 1968. Haga died in 2010.

References

1926 births
2010 deaths
People from Odda
Norwegian journalists
Norwegian sports journalists
Norwegian music journalists
Jazz writers
Norwegian television news anchors
NRK people